Kout Food Group K.S.C.C. is a Kuwaiti-based conglomerate, founded in 1982, operating in Kuwait, Jordan, Lebanon, Morocco, Qatar, Kurdistan-Iraq, and the United Arab Emirates, and formerly in the United Kingdom. The business also offer catering services, import and export of food related items, representation of foreign companies as well as advising others in such businesses.

History 
In 1982, Kout Food Group began with its first concept, Hungry Bunny. It would later go on to create the Ayyame, Fol O'Yasmine, Melting Point and ScoopACone brands. In addition to this, the group also franchises Applebee's, Burger King, Burj Al Hamam, Kabab-ji, Pizza Hut, Subway and Taco Bell across the Middle East.

United Kingdom 
In 2005, the group entered the UK market as a franchisee of Burger King. In 2007, the group acquired the Maison Blanc bakery chain of stores and its Park Royal production facility, rescuing it from Lyndale who later collapsed into administration. In 2008, alongside Alan Yau, it would create the fast-casual Chinese noodle bar concept, Cha Cha Moon; which opened its inaugural location in London's Kingly Court. A second Cha Cha Moon location was attempted in the declining Whiteleys Shopping Centre, however it was later transformed into Cafe Licious, Chi Wok and Pasta Rossa in an attempt to attract a wider audience. Later in 2008, Kout opened its fast-casual Italian dining concept Kitchen Italia brand in the Westfield Shopping Centre and Covent Garden. Its Kitchen Italia projects would cease in 2013 citing low trade.

In 2012, the group added KFC to its UK portfolio, acquiring a number of franchised locations. In August 2013, the group acquired the Little Chef restaurant chain, alongside the trademarks for the former Happy Eater and Coffee Tempo! brands, purchased from private-equity firm RCapital for £15 million. The group were reported to be the only bidder who wanted to retain the Little Chef brand, as other bidders wanted to redevelop the sites. This purchase also included a number of Burger King locations which were attached to the Little Chef properties, with the group continuing to add Burger King and Subway locations to the sites after its purchase. In 2013 and 2014, the group acquired a number of Costa Coffee franchises. In 2016, it trademarked the name Shi Chang, but did not use it.

In January 2016, the group began to show signs of leaving the UK, first by closing its Whiteleys location, and then selling Cha Cha Moon's Kingly Court building lease later that September. In December 2016, there were talks Patisserie Valerie would purchase Maison Blanc from Kout Food Group, however these talks fell through, with Maison Blanc closing down completely a few months later. In January 2017, Euro Garages purchased the locations used by the Little Chef chain, which it would then convert into its own partner brands by October 2018, with Kout Food Group retaining the actual ownership of the Little Chef brand. In September 2017, the group sold its KFC franchises to The Herbert Group. In February 2019, its production facility in Park Royal was sold to Joe and Sephs. In January 2020, the group sold its remaining Burger King locations to BK UK, and then left the UK market completely in August 2020 by selling off its Costa Coffee franchises to Gerry's Offshore UK. Its defunct UK brands, such as Little Chef and Maison Blanc, are now registered in Kuwait under the main parent company.

References

External links 
 Kout Food Group (official website)
 

Food companies of Kuwait
Food and drink companies established in 1982
Retailing in Kuwait
Burger King
Pizza Hut
Kuwaiti companies established in 1982

kout.